Critical Studies in Media Communication (CSMC) is a peer-reviewed academic journal covering media and mass communication from a cultural studies and critical perspective. The journal is published by Taylor & Francis on behalf of the National Communication Association. CSMC publishes original scholarship in mediated and mass communication from a cultural studies and/or critical perspective. It particularly welcomes submissions that enrich debates among various critical traditions, methodological and analytical approaches, and theoretical standpoints.

CSMC takes an inclusive view of media and welcomes scholarship on topics such as: 

 media audiences
 representations
 institutions
 digital technologies
 social media
 gaming
 professional practices and ethics
 production studies
 media history
 political economy

Abstracting and indexing 
The journal is abstracted and indexed in

External links 
 

Taylor & Francis academic journals
English-language journals
Media studies journals
Publications established in 1984
5 times per year journals